This article contains the awards and nominations of the singer Jill Scott.

Grammy Awards
The Grammy Awards are awarded annually by the National Academy of Recording Arts and Sciences of the United States for outstanding achievements in the record industry. Scott has received three awards from 13 nominations.

|-
|align="center" rowspan=3|2001 
| Herself 
| Best New Artist 
| 
|-
| Who Is Jill Scott? Words and Sounds Vol. 1
| Best R&B Album 
| 
|-
| "Gettin' In the Way" 
| rowspan=4|Best Female R&B Vocal Performance 
| 
|-
| align="center" |2002 
| "A Long Walk" 
| 
|-
| align="center" |2003 
| "He Loves Me (Lyzel in E Flat) (Movements I, II, III)"
| 
|-
| align="center" rowspan=3|2005 
| "Whatever"
| 
|-
| Beautifully Human: Words and Sounds Vol. 2
| Best R&B Album 
| 
|-
| "Cross My Mind" 
| Best Urban/Alternative Performance 
| 
|-
| align="center"|2007 
| "God Bless the Child" (with George Benson and Al Jarreau) 
| Best Traditional R&B Performance 
| 
|-
| align="center" rowspan=3|2008 
| "Hate on Me" 
| Best Female R&B Vocal Performance 
| 
|-
| The Real Thing: Words and Sounds Vol. 3
| Best R&B Album 
| 
|-
| "Daydreamin'" (with Lupe Fiasco) 
| Best Urban/Alternative Performance 
| 
|-
| align="center"|2011 
| "Love" (with Chuck Brown and Marcus Miller)
| Best R&B Performance by a Duo or Group with Vocals 
| 
|-
| align="center"|2017 
| "Can't Wait"
| Best Traditional R&B Performance
|

Soul Train Music Awards

Lady of Soul Awards

BET Awards

BETJ Virtual Awards

NAACP Image Awards

|-
|rowspan="4"|2001
|rowspan="2"|Jill Scott
|Outstanding New Artist
|
|-
|Outstanding Female Artist
|
|-
|"Gettin' In the Way"
|Outstanding Song
|
|-
|Who Is Jill Scott? Words and Sounds Vol. 1
|Outstanding Album
|
|-
|rowspan="4"|2002
|Jill Scott
|Outstanding Female Artist
|
|-
|"Kingdom Come Theme Song" with Kirk Franklin
|Outstanding Duo or Group
|
|-
|"He Loves Me (Lyzel In E Flat)"
|Outstanding Song
|
|-
|Experience: Jill Scott 826+
|Outstanding Album
|
|-
|rowspan="3"|2005
|Jill Scott
|Outstanding Female Artist
|
|-
|rowspan="2"|"Golden"
|Outstanding Song
|
|-
|Outstanding Music Video
|
|-
|rowspan="2"|2008
|Jill Scott
|Outstanding Female Artist
|
|-
|Why Did I Get Married
|Outstanding Actress in a Motion Picture
|
|-
|2010
|The No. 1 Ladies' Detective Agency
|Outstanding Actress in a Drama Series
|
|-
|rowspan="2"|2012
|Sins of the Mother
|Outstanding Actress in a Television Movie, Mini-Series or Dramatic Special
|
|-
|Why Did I Get Married Too?
|Outstanding Supporting Actress in a Motion Picture
|
|-
|2018
|Flint
|Outstanding Actress in a Television Movie, Mini-Series or Dramatic Special
|
|}

MTV Video Music Awards
2001, Best R&B Video: "Gettin' In the Way" (Nominated)

Satellite Awards
2009, Best Actress Drama Series: The Ladies No. 1 Detective Agency (Nominated)

Vibe Awards
2004, R&B Voice of the Year (Nominated)

References

Scott, Jill
Awards